Flaccilla aecas, the aecas ruby-eye, is a species of skipper butterfly in the family Hesperiidae. It is the only species in the monotypic genus Flaccilla. It is found from Mexico to southern Brazil.

References 

Hesperiidae genera
Hesperiinae
Butterflies of Central America
Hesperiidae of South America
Butterflies of North America
Taxa named by Caspar Stoll
Butterflies described in 1781
Monotypic butterfly genera